Underground Agent is a 1942 American drama film directed by Michael Gordon and starring Bruce Bennett, Leslie Brooks, Frank Albertson, and Julian Rivero. The film was released by Columbia Pictures.

Plot
Two U.S. government agents (Bruce Bennett and Frank Albertson) are assigned to prevent Nazi spies involved in a eavesdropping scheme from infiltrating into a Southern California war-defense plant. To help them in their venture, one of the agents invents an ingenious word-scrambler that eventually leads them to the German spies.

Cast
Bruce Bennett as Lee Graham
Leslie Brooks as Ann Carter
Frank Albertson as Johnny Davis
Julian Rivero as Miguel Gonzales
George McKay as Pete Dugan
Rhys Williams as Henry Miller
Henry Victor as Johann Schrode
Addison Richards as George Martin
Rosina Galli as Maria Gonzales
Leonard Strong as Count Akiri
Hans Conried as Hugo

References

External links
 
 

1942 drama films
1942 films
Columbia Pictures films
Films directed by Michael Gordon
American drama films
1940s American films